Ian Key (born 30 July 1954) is a South African cricketer. He played in two first-class matches for Border in 1976/77.

See also
 List of Border representative cricketers

References

External links
 

1954 births
Living people
South African cricketers
Border cricketers
Cricketers from East London, Eastern Cape